Bert Solomon (8 March 1885 – 30 June 1961) regarded by many as the finest rugby player to ever come out of Cornwall was a Cornish rugby union player who competed in the 1908 Summer Olympics at White City Stadium, London. He played for Redruth R.F.C. and was capped 26 times for Cornwall.

He was a member of the Cornwall rugby union team, which on 26 October 1908 won the Olympic silver medal for Great Britain. He also played for Cornwall in the County Championship final match against Durham that same year, at Redruth, scoring twice in a famous 17-3 victory, Bert was capped by England against Wales in 1910, the first year Twickenham opened and scored a wonderful individual try in a 11-6 win. Although being selected for further matches against Scotland, Ireland and France he declined and also declined an invitation to tour with the British and Irish Lions in 1908 to Australia and New Zealand. Around the same time, it was reported that he refused 400 golden sovereigns to sign for a Rugby league team in the north of England.

In 1910 when he was just 25 years old and in his prime Bert Solomon hung his boots up and a legend was created.

It is also reported that Bert was a solitary character, who like nothing better than his pigeons. Sometimes he refused to play for Redruth if his pigeons were still out, and often had to be cajoled into playing. Such was his skill that he apparently made a difference of 1000 people on a crowd.

The Solomon legacy will forever live in the hearts and memories of all Cornish rugby supporters, he excited a generation of Cornish folk with his dazzling skills, a rugby genius who was outshining the greatest internationals of his era and who at the end of the day was happier out of the spotlight.

There is now a book published regarding his life and career.

See also

Cornish rugby
Rugby union at the 1908 Summer Olympics

References

External links

1885 births
1961 deaths
British rugby union players
Rugby union players at the 1908 Summer Olympics
Olympic rugby union players of Great Britain
Olympic silver medallists for Great Britain
Cornish rugby union players
Medalists at the 1908 Summer Olympics
Rugby union centres
Rugby union wings